"She's Not the Cheatin' Kind" is a song written by Ronnie Dunn and recorded by American country music duo Brooks & Dunn.  It was released in August 1994 as the lead-off single from their album Waitin' on Sundown.  The song reached the top of the Billboard Hot Country Singles & Tracks (now Hot Country Songs) chart, becoming the duo's seventh Number One single.

Music video
The music video is mostly in black-and-white, and was directed by Piers Plowden and premiered in mid-1994.

Chart positions

Year-end charts

References

1994 singles
Brooks & Dunn songs
Songs written by Ronnie Dunn
Song recordings produced by Scott Hendricks
Song recordings produced by Don Cook
Arista Nashville singles
Country ballads
Black-and-white music videos
1994 songs